Daichi (written: , ,  or ) is a masculine Japanese given name. Notable people with the name include:

, Japanese mixed martial artist
, Japanese cross-country skier
, Japanese manga artist
, Japanese footballer
, Japanese footballer
, Japanese footballer
, Japanese singer and dancer
, former Japanese football player
, Japanese shogi player
, Japanese pole vaulter
, Japanese basketball player
, Japanese footballer
, Japanese swimmer
, Japanese baseball player

Fictional characters 
 Daichi Bunta (aka Clover King), a character from J.A.K.Q. Dengekitai
, a character from Machine Robo Rescue.
, a character from Yu-Gi-Oh! GX
, a character in the manga series Shugo Chara!
, a character from Beyblade G-Revolution
, a character from Kousoku Sentai Turboranger
 Daichi Tokugawa, a character from Astro Boy (2003)
, is the team captain of the Karasuno Volleyball team in the sports anime Haikyuu!! (2015)
 Daichi from Japanese television series adaptation Good Morning Call
 Yatsuhashi Daichi, a character from RWBY
, a character from a game called "Devil Survivor 2"
Daichi Shinagawa : the main male character from « Yankee-kun to Megane-chan » (Flunk Punk Rumble in English), a Japanese manga also adapted as a drama written by Miki Yoshikawa.
kitazawa daichi,from Manga Kitchen princess

See also 
 Daichi (disambiguation)
 Dai-ichi (also transliterated "daiichi")
 Advanced Land Observation Satellite, nicknamed "Daichi"

Japanese masculine given names